Victor Mar Manuel (October 17, 1954 – January 28, 2006) was a Mexican professional wrestler, better known by his ring name, Black Cat. He was best known for his work in Japan.

Professional wrestling career

Universal Wrestling Association (1977–1981)
Victor Mar Manuel was born on October 17, 1954, in Mexico City, Mexico. He trained under his father, Huroki Sito, a luchadore. He made his professional wrestling debut on April 21, 1977, under the ring name Kuroneko which was translated Black Cat. In his debut match, on April 21, 1977, he defeated Mr. Bronce at a Universal Wrestling Association event. In UWA, he was a midcarder working for promotion's small buildings including Arena Naucalpan and Arena Neza. In 1979, he won the Naucalpan Tag Team Championship with Villano IV.

New Japan Pro-Wrestling (1981–1994)
After spending four years with UWA, he translated himself into Black Cat. He debuted in Japanese promotion New Japan Pro-Wrestling on April 21, 1981, as a luchadore opponent for Tiger Mask whom he went on to beat in a puroresu vs. lucha libre match. In 1982, he briefly returned to Mexico but came back to NJPW as a referee. He also wrestled there as an undercarder against ascending stars. During his years wrestling there, he would exchange his stands between Japan and Mexico to help young talent in their training.

He would mainly wrestle against inumerous foreign wrestlers that would tour in Japan (notable opponents such as Adrian Adonis in May 1985, El Canek in April 1986, Kevin Von Erich in June 1987, Dr. Wagner Jr. in June 1988, Black Tiger in June 1989, Cheetah Kid in March 1990, Bobby Eaton in February 1994 and many more to date), and also would defeat young talent such as Kensuke Sasaki, Koji Kanemoto, Michiyoshi Ohara, Takayuki Iizuka, Osamu Matsuda, and would also aid New Japan in rivalries against rival promotions.

In 1990, Black Cat wrestled in NJPW shows staged in Harbin, China and Baghdad, Iraq.

Asistencia Asesoría y Administración (1994)
In February 1994, Black Cat left NJPW and debuted in Asistencia Asesoría y Administración, a promotion in his hometown Mexico which was his return to Mexico. After his debut in AAA, he joined the stable Los Gringos Locos as the latest member of the stable. The group consisted of La Pareja del Terror (Eddie Guerrero and "Love Machine" Art Barr), Konnan and Madonna's Boyfriend. This group was the most hated stable in the history of lucha libre. While in AAA, he feuded with Mascarita Sagrada. At TripleMania II-A, held on April 26, 1994, he teamed with Guerrero and Barr but lost to El Hijo del Santo, Octagon and Perro Aguayo.

New Japan Pro-Wrestling (1994–2003)
In September 1994, Black Cat made his return to NJPW, often teaming with the masked Love Machine and Black Tiger. He stayed there and kept wrestling as an undercarder but without returning to AAA, with his most notable work there during the decade being aiding New Japan against UWF-i wrestlers. In 1995, Black Cat travelled to North Korea to wrestle in NJPW's Collision in Korea show.

During his second stint with NJPW he also refereed some matches until 2001, when he was involved in a serious injury against El Samurai. Two years later, in 2003, he retired as a referee and as a professional wrestler.

World Championship Wrestling (1998)
While in January 1998, he made four appearances with Atlanta, Georgia based World Championship Wrestling. His first WCW appearance was at the January 12, 1998, edition of Nitro where he lost to Marty Jannetty. His second appearance with WCW was on the January 15 Thunder where he teamed with Ohara and Gedo but lost to Steiner Brothers and Ray Traylor in a 6-man tag team match. His third appearance was a loss to Chris Adams on the March 28, 1998 episode of WCW Worldwide. His fourth and final appearance was a loss to Booker T on the April 4, 1998 episode of WCW Worldwide.

Death
Manuel suffered a massive heart attack and died on January 28, 2006.

Championships and accomplishments
New Japan Pro-Wrestling
Greatest Wrestlers (Class of 2009)
Mexico City Boxing and Wrestling Commission
Mexican National Junior Heavyweight Championship (1 time)
Pro Wrestling Illustrated
 PWI ranked him #435 of the top 500 singles wrestlers the PWI 500 in 1995
Tokyo Sports
 Service Award (2006) 
Universal Wrestling Association
 Naucalpan Tag Team Championship (1 time) - with Rokambole

Luchas de Apuestas record

References

External links
Online World of Wrestling Profile
Luchawiki Profile

1954 births
2006 deaths
Mexican male professional wrestlers
Professional wrestlers from Mexico City
Expatriate professional wrestlers in Japan